Bo Mitchell is an American former Negro league pitcher who played in the 1930s.

Mitchell played for the Birmingham Black Barons in 1937, and played for both Birmingham and the Atlanta Black Crackers the following season. In 21 recorded games on the mound, he posted a 4.16 ERA over 125.1 innings.

References

External links
 and Seamheads

Year of birth missing
Place of birth missing
Atlanta Black Crackers players
Birmingham Black Barons players
Baseball pitchers